Mika Niemi (born 10 March 1988) is a Finnish professional ice hockey forward currently playing for Ässät in the Liiga.

Niemi has formerly played with Ässät Pori and Oulun Kärpät of the Finnish Liiga. Following the 2017–18 season, his second with Jokerit, Niemi agreed to a one-year contract extension on April 9, 2018.

References

External links

1988 births
Living people
Ässät players
Finnish ice hockey forwards
Jokerit players
Oulun Kärpät players
Sportspeople from Pori